Anal or Anāl, also known as Pakan Naga after the two principal villages where it is spoken in, is a Southern Naga language, part of the Sino-Tibetan language family, spoken by the Anal people in India and a dwindling number in Myanmar.  It had 83,000 speakers in India according to the 2001 census, and 55,000 in Myanmar in 2010. It has two principal clans, Murchal and Moshum, and is closest to Lamkang. The language of wider communication is Meitei language. The name "Anal" was given by the Meitei people of Manipur valley.
Anal is written in the Latin script, with a literacy rate of about 87%.

Geographical distribution
Anal is spoken in Chandel district, southeastern Manipur, on the banks of the Chakpi River in Chandel, Chakpikarong, and Tangnoupal subdivisions (Ethnologue).

Phonology

Consonants 

/dʒ/ can also be heard as a glide [j] in free variation.

Vowels

Vocabulary
The following vocabulary exemplifies words in the language.

References

External links 

 ELAR collection: A community-driven documentation of natural discourse in Anal, an endangered Tibeto-Burman language deposited by Pavel Ozerov
 Anal DoReCo corpus compiled by Pavel Ozerov. Audio recordings of narrative texts, with transcriptions time-aligned at the phone level and translations.

Bibliography

Southern Naga languages
Languages of Manipur
Endangered languages of India
Hmar
Endangered Sino-Tibetan languages